An assault boat is a boat used for landing in combat, specifically for inland waters. Assault boats are light weight to be carried by multiple men. They can either be paddled or fitted with an outboard motor for high-speed operation. Some assault boats can be fitted with small firearms such as automatic rifles. Larger assault boats are used in riverine and littoral water where the boat can easily berthed in tight spaces and shallow waters. The length of assault boats is usually 5 to 20 meters and are made either from rubber, fiberglass, aluminum, or steel.

WWII

U.S. military

Assault boats in the U.S. military during World War II were typically the property of Combat Engineer Battalions, whose combat engineers also deployed and crewed them.

The Americans deployed two types of assault boats. The "Storm Boat" was an 8-man (6+2 crew) high-speed assault boat with a 55 horsepower outboard motor designed to breach at speed thus allowing the soldiers on board to "storm the shore". The "M2" was a ten-man boat (8+2 crew) that was paddled.

British
The British used two types of assault boat: a "storm boat" and a lower performance canvas boat- "The Goatley boat".

Overview of the differences between British and American Storm and Assault Boats 

Section 8. Comparison of River Crossing Equipment, From the Engineer chapter of A Military Encyclopedia Based on Operations in the Italian Campaigns, 1943-1945

Assault Boats
a. British Canvas Boats. (The 'Goatley boat')
(1) Easily portable (Could be carried open by four men).
(2) Easily maneuvered in the water when loaded.
(3) Easily damaged in transit by rough handling.
(4) Not easily repaired.
(5) Could carry ten men.
(6) Only weighed 150 kilograms (330 Ib).
(7) Only took two minutes to assemble by two men.

b. U.S. Plywood Boat, M-2.
(1) Not so easily portable.
(2) Easily maneuvered in the water, loaded or empty.
(3) Not so easily damaged in transit (boats "nest").
(4) More easily repaired.
(5) Served dual purpose (i.e. making infantry support rafts and expedient assault boat bridge).
(6) Much noisier in use with non-rubber shod personnel.

c. Conclusions:
(1) The American pattern assault boat was decidedly more robust and had the great advantage of dual purpose. However, the British boat proved itself perfectly adequate for its primary task which did not require excellent durability.

Storm Boats

a. British Storm Boat.
(1) Heavier to carry across the country.
(2) Would carry the heavier load (6-pounders or jeep though the latter a top-heavy load).
(3) Carried ten men, but with a lower speed.

b. American Storm Boat.
(1) Carried by 6 men (plus 2 for motor).
(2) Would carry up to 1500 lbs with very little reduction in speed.
(3) Carried 7 men (above crew) at maximum speed.
(4) Was the faster boat; would beach at full speed.

c. Conclusions:
(1) For assault crossing of personnel the U.S. boat carried fewer men but got them across the river and in action much faster.
(2) For cargo carrying, British boat carried a greater load but at a slower speed.

See also
 Landing Craft Rubber Small
 Landing Craft Rubber Large
 Rigid Raider
 Mk 6 Assault Boat
 Combat Rubber Raiding Craft
 Goatley boat

References

External links
WWII 40th Combat Engineers - Storm Boats
WWII 12th Army Engineer Group - "The Rhine Crossing"
"National Liberation Museum" of The Netherlands during WWII
 Engineer Assault Boats in Canadian Service

Landing craft